Zaozerye is a rural locality (a village) in Yershovskoye Rural Settlement, Sheksninsky District, Vologda Oblast, Russia. The population was 19 as of 2002.

Geography 
Zaozerye is located 30 km north of Sheksna (the district's administrative centre) by road. Pustoshka is the nearest rural locality.

References 

Rural localities in Sheksninsky District